Alexander Porphyrogenitus (Alexandros, 23 November 8706 June  913) was briefly Byzantine emperor from 912 to 913, and the third emperor of the Macedonian dynasty.

Life
Alexander was the third son of Emperor Basil I and Eudokia Ingerina. Unlike his older brother Leo VI the Wise, his paternity was not disputed between Basil I and Michael III because he was born years after the death of Michael. As a child, Alexander was crowned as co-emperor by his father in early 879, following the death of Basil's son Constantine.

Upon the death of his brother Leo on 11 May  912, Alexander succeeded as senior emperor alongside Leo's young son Constantine VII.  He was the first Byzantine emperor to use the term "autocrator" on coinage to celebrate the ending of his thirty-three years as co-emperor. Alexander promptly dismissed most of Leo's advisers and appointees, including the admiral Himerios, the patriarch Euthymios, and the Empress Zoe Karbonopsina, the mother of Constantine VII whom he locked up in a nunnery. The patriarchate was again conferred on Nicholas Mystikos, who had been removed from this position because he had opposed Leo's fourth marriage. 

During his short reign, Alexander found himself attacked by the forces of Al-Muqtadir of the Abbasid Caliphate in the East, and provoked a war with Simeon I of Bulgaria by refusing to send the traditional tribute on his accession. Alexander died soon after, allegedly because of a stomach disease caused by excessive eating and alcohol.

The sources are uniformly hostile towards Alexander, who is depicted as lazy, lecherous, drunk, and malignant, including the rumor that he planned to castrate the young Constantine VII in order to exclude him from the succession. At least that charge did not come to pass, but Alexander left his successor a hostile regent (Nicholas Mystikos) and the beginning of a long war against Bulgaria. The sources also accused the Emperor of idolatry, including making pagan sacrifices to the golden statue of a boar in the Hippodrome and had it provided with new teeth and genitals in hope of curing his impotence.

See also

List of Byzantine emperors

Notes

References

Sources

 

10th-century Byzantine emperors
Macedonian dynasty
870 births
913 deaths
Porphyrogennetoi
9th-century Byzantine people
910s in the Byzantine Empire
Sons of Byzantine emperors